Matthew Worley is a British academic and author. He is Professor of Modern History at the University of Reading.

Education
He attended Heartsease Comprehensive School in Norwich. He completed his BA and PhD studies at the University of Nottingham.

Research

Worley has two main fields of historical interest: 20th century British communism and fascism, and punk and post-punk subculture and popular music. He is a fellow of the Royal Historical Society.

He is founder and co-editor of the journal Twentieth Century Communism. He is also a founding member of the Subcultures Network, a group of over 5000 people who research and are interested in subcultural practices.

CRASH!
From 1997, Worley has worked with the artist and designer Scott King under the name CRASH!. Together, they have published numerous magazines, held exhibitions, made a film and contributed to art shows. In 1999, they formed part of Malcolm McLaren's project to become Mayor of London.

Books

Worley, M. 2017. No Future: Politics, Punk and Society, 1976-84. Cambridge: Cambridge University Press. DOI 10.1017/9781316779569
Worley, M. 2010. Oswald Mosley and the New Party. Basingstoke: Palgrave Macmillan. ISBN 978-0-230-20697-7.
Worley, M. 2005. Labour Inside the Gate: A History of the British Labour Party Between the Wars. London: IB Tauris. ISBN 9781845113322.
2002 Class Against Class: The Communist Party in Britain Between the Wars (I.B.Tauris)

Edited collections
  
Smith, E. and Worley, M., eds. 2021. The British Left and Ireland in the 20th Century. London: Routledge.
Henry, W. and Worley, M., eds. 2021. Narratives From Beyond the UK Reggae Bassline: The System is Sound. London: Palgrave Macmillan. 
Puccini, J., Smith, E., and Worley, M., eds. 2018. The Far Left in Australia since 1945. London: Routledge.
2018 (Subcultures Network)   Ripped, Torn and Cut: Pop, Politics and Punk Fanzines from 1976 (Manchester University Press)
Smith, E., and Worley, M., eds. 2017. Waiting for the Revolution: The British Far Left from 1956. Manchester: Manchester University Press.
Copsey, N., and Worley, M. 2017. Tomorrow Belongs to Us: The British Far Right since 1967. London: Routledge.
Dines, M., and Worley, M. 2016. The Aesthetic of our Anger: Anarcho-Punk, Politics and Music. Colchester: Minor Compositions. Open Access.
Subcultures Network (Worley, M. a member of), eds. 2015. Fight Back: Punk, Politics and Resistance. Manchester: Manchester University Press.
2014 (ed) with Evan Smith, Against the Grain: The Far Left in Britain from 1956 (Manchester University Press
Worley, M., ed. 2009. The Foundations of the British Labour Party: Identities, Cultures and Perspectives. Ashgate.
2008 (ed.) with N. LaPorte & K. Morgan, Bolshevism, Stalinism and the Comintern: Perspectives on Stalinization, 1917–53 (Palgrave Macmillan).
2005 (ed.) Labour’s Grass Roots: Essays on the Activities of Local Labour Parties and Members, 1918–45 (Ashgate)
2004 (ed.) In Search of Revolution: International Communist Parties in the Third Period (I.B.Tauris)

Selected articles
2022  ‘Whip in My Valise: British Punk and the Marquis de Sade, c. 1975–85’,  Contemporary British History, 36/2
2020 ‘If I had more time it could be better, but the new wave’s about spontaneity, right?’: Finding meaning in Britain’s early punk fanzines (1976–77), Punk & Post-Punk, 9/2
2018 (with John Street & David Wilkinson), ‘“Does it threaten the status quo?’ Elite Responses to British Punk, 1976–78’, Popular Music, 37/2
2018 (with Kirsty Lohman), ‘Bloody Revolutions, Fascist Dreams, Anarchy and Peace: Crass, Rondos and the Politics of Punk, 1977–84’, Britain and the World: Historical Journal of the British Scholar Society, 11/1,
2016 ‘Marx–Lenin–Rotten–Strummer: British Marxism and Youth Culture in the 1970s’, Contemporary British History, 30/4
2016 (with Nigel Copsey), ‘White Youth: The Far Right, Punk and British Youth Culture’, Journalism, Media and Cultural Studies, 9, 
2015 ‘Punk, Politics and British (fan)zines, 1976–84: “While the world was dying, did you wonder why?”’, History Workshop Journal, 79                                                                         
2014  ‘“Hey Little Rich Boy, Take a Good Look at Me”: Punk, Class and British Oi!’, Punk & Post-Punk, 3/1 
2013  ‘Oi! Oi! Oi!: Class, Locality and British Punk’, Twentieth Century British History, 24/4,  
2012 ‘Shot By Both Sides: Punk, Politics and the End of “Consensus”’, Contemporary British History, 26/3, 333–54  
2011  ‘One Nation Under the Bomb: The Cold War and British Punk to 1984’, Journal for the Study of Radicalism, 5/2, 
2011 ‘Why Fascism? Sir Oswald Mosley and the Conception of the British Union of Fascists’, History, 96/1, 66–81  
2007 ‘What Was the New Party? Sir Oswald Mosley and Associated Responses to the “Crisis”, 1931–32’, History, 92/1  
2004 (with Karen Hunt), ‘Rethinking British Communist Party Women in the 1920s’, Twentieth Century British History, 15/1
2000   ‘Left Turn: A Reassessment of the Communist Party of Great Britain in the Third Period, 1928–35’, Twentieth Century British History, 11/4, 
2000  ‘The Communist International, the CPGB and the Third Period’, European History Quarterly, 30/2

References

Academics of the University of Reading
Alumni of the University of Nottingham
Year of birth missing (living people)
Living people